The 2014–15 Logan Cup was a first-class cricket competition held in Zimbabwe from 9 December 2013 to 26 April 2014. After the 2013–14 season Southern Rocks, consistently the weakest of the five teams, had their franchise suspended, leaving only four teams to compete. The tournament was won by the Matabeleland Tuskers, who claimed their fourth title.

Tinotenda Mutombodzi of the Mashonaland Eagles finished the competition as the leading run-scorer, accumulating 630 runs. The leading wicket-taker was Welshman Bradley Wadlan of the Mid West Rhinos, with 39 wickets, who had previously played Minor Counties for Herefordshire and Wales Minor Counties.

Points table

External links
 Series home at ESPN Cricinfo

References

Logan Cup
Logan Cup
Logan Cup
Logan Cup